The Remix Album may refer to:

The Remix Album (4hero album), 2004
The Remix Album (All Saints album), 1998
The Remix Album (Champion album), 2006
The Remix Album (Lisa Stansfield album), 1998
The Remix Album (Milli Vanilli album), 1990
The Remix Album (Prince Ital Joe album), 1995
The Remix Album (Vengaboys album), 2000
The Remix Album...Diamonds Are Forever, by Shirley Bassey, 2000
The Remix Album, by Cascada, 2006
The Remix Album, by Sandy & Papo, 1998

See also
Remix album